The Shri Ganganagar–Jammu Tawi Express is an Express train belonging to North Western Railway zone that runs between  and  in India. It is currently being operated with 14713/14714 train numbers on a weekly basis.

Service

The 14713/Shri Ganganagar–Jammu Tawi Express has an average speed of 46 km/hr and covers 548 km in 11h 50m. The 14714/Jammu Tawi–Shri Ganganagar Express has an average speed of 43 km/hr and covers 548 km in 12h 50m.

Route and halts 

The important halts of the train are:

 
 Abohar Junction
 
 Barnala

Coach composition

The train has standard ICF rakes with max speed of 110 kmph. The train consists of 20 coaches:

 2 AC II Tier
 4 AC III Tier
 7 Sleeper coaches
 6 General Unreserved
 2 Seating cum Luggage Rake

Traction

Both trains are hauled by a Tuglakabad Loco Shed-based WDP-3A diesel locomotive from Shri Ganganagar to Jammu Tawi and vice versa.

Direction reversal

The train reverses its direction 1 times:

Rake sharing

The train shares its rake with 12485/12486 Hazur Sahib Nanded–Shri Ganganagar Express

See also 

 Shri Ganganagar Junction railway station
 Jammu Tawi railway station
 Hazur Sahib Nanded–Shri Ganganagar Express

Notes

References

External links 

 14713/Shri Ganganagar–Jammu Tawi Express India Rail Info
 14714/Jammu Tawi–Shri Ganganagar Express India Rail Info

Transport in Jammu
Express trains in India
Rail transport in Haryana
Rail transport in Delhi
Rail transport in Punjab, India
Rail transport in Rajasthan
Railway services introduced in 2014
Transport in Sri Ganganagar